David Joseph Leite is a Portuguese American food writer, cookbook author, memoirist, and founder of the two-time James Beard Award-winning website Leite's Culinaria.

Early life 

Leite was born in Fall River, Massachusetts, and raised in Swansea, where he graduated from Joseph Case High School in 1978.

Career 

He has written for The New York Times, Martha Stewart Living Bon Appétit, Saveur, Food & Wine, Gourmet, Food Arts, Men's Health, The Los Angeles Times Magazine, Chicago Sun Times, The Washington Post, and other publications in the United States and abroad. Leite won the 2008 James Beard Award for Best Newspaper Feature Without Recipes. He also won the 2006 and 2007 James Beard Award for Best Internet Website for Food. Leite is a four-time nominee for the Bert Greene Award for Food Journalism, which he won in 2006. He is also a recipient of several awards from the Association of Food Journalists. His work has been featured in Best Food Writing 14 times since 2001. Leite was a contributor to The Morning News. He was also a recurring guest on the Today Show, the Martha Stewart Radio program Living Today hosted by Mario Bosquez, and Connecticut Style. He has been heard on Good Food with Evan Kleiman, Lucinda Scala Quinn's program, Mad Hungry Monday and various NPR programs. Leite has appeared on History Channel 2's United Stuff of America and Food Network's Beat Bobby Flay. He reads his essays and columns, as well as acts as a correspondent, on public radio's food program The Splendid Table hosted by Lynne Rossetto Kasper. In 2012 he served a guest host of Cooking Today on Martha Stewart Radio. In 2013 he began broadcasting the popular podcast Talking With My Mouth Full.  In August 2009 his first book, The New Portuguese Table: Exciting Flavors From Europe's Western Coast, was published by Clarkson Potter and won the 2010 First Book/Julia Child Award. A humorist, Leite brings a skewed and funny sensibility to the world of food.

In 2016, he was featured on the "Our Portuguese Table" podcast hosted by Angela Simões and Maria Lawton.

Notes on a Banana: A Memoir of Food, Love, and Manic Depression, Leite's second book, was published on April 11, 2017, by Dey Street Books, a division of HarperCollins.

Awards 

 Association of Food Journalists Awards
 Awards Beard James
 Bert Greene Awards
 Culinary Hall of Fame Induction
 IACP/Julia Child Award for Best First Book

Bibliography 
 Notes on a Banana: A Memoir of Food, Love, and Manic Depression. Dey Street Books: 2017.
 The New Portuguese Table: Exciting Flavors From Europe's Western Coast. Clarkson Potter: 2009.

References 

American food writers
Living people
American people of Portuguese descent
1960 births
American male non-fiction writers
People from Fall River, Massachusetts
People from Swansea, Massachusetts
21st-century American male writers
21st-century American non-fiction writers
Writers from Massachusetts
American LGBT writers
LGBT chefs
People with bipolar disorder